The 1933 Penn State Nittany Lions men's soccer team represented Pennsylvania State University during the 1933 season playing in the Intercollegiate Soccer League. It was the program's 23rd season fielding a men's varsity soccer team. The 1933 season is William Jeffrey's eighth year at the helm.

Background 

The 1933 season was the Nittany Lions' 23rd season as a varsity soccer program, and their 8th season playing as a part of the Intercollegiate Soccer Football Association. The team was led by 8th year head coach, William Jeffrey, who had previously served as the head coach for the semi-professional soccer team, Altoona Works.

The Nittany Lions team was invited by the Italian Government to be the United States representative in the 1933 International University Games in Turin, Italy. The team declined the invitation.

Penn State shared the 1933 Intercollegiate Soccer Football Association national championship title with Penn.

Squad

Departures

Schedule 

|-
!colspan=8 style=""| Regular season
|-

References

External links 

1933
Penn State Nittany Lions men's soccer
Intercollegiate Soccer Football Association Championship-winning seasons